Désormais is an album by Julie Doiron, released in 2001. It is her first, and to date only, album of French language material. "Désormais" translates to English as "Henceforth".

Track listing
 "Ce charmant coeur (This Charming Heart)" - 2:15
 "La Jeune amoureuse (The Young Lovers)" - 3:21
 "Faites de beaux rêves (Sweet Dreams)" - 1:57
 "Don't Ask" - 3:28
 "Le Piano (The Piano)" - 4:32
 "Tu es malade (You Are Sick)" - 3:02
 "Au contraire (On the Contrary)” - 3:11
 "Pour toujours (Forever)" - 4:56
 "Penses-donc (Tu es seule) (Do You Think (You Are Alone))" - 1:54
 "Faites de beaux rêves (Sweet Dreams)" - 02:16

References

2001 albums
Julie Doiron albums
Jagjaguwar albums